Goodenia calcarata, commonly known as streaked goodenia, is a species of flowering plant in the family Goodeniaceae and is endemic to Australia. It is an erect, annual herb with toothed egg-shaped to oblong leaves, racemes of white, cream-coloured or pink to mauve flowers with brownish markings, and oval fruit.

Description

Taxonomy and naming
Streaked goodenia was first formally described in 1853 by Ferdinand von Mueller who gave it the name Picrophyta calcarata in the journal Linnaea: ein Journal für die Botanik in ihrem ganzen Umfange, oder Beiträge zur Pflanzenkunde. In 1867, von Mueller changed the name to Goodenia calcarata in Fragmenta Phytographiae Australiae.

Distribution and habitat
Goodenia calcarata grows in stony places in South Australia, the far south of the Northern Territory, west of Tibooburra in New South Wales and in south western Queensland.

Conservation status
Goodenia calcarata is classified as "near threatened" under the Northern Territory Government Territory Parks and Wildlife Conservation Act 1976.

References

calcarata
Flora of South Australia
Flora of the Northern Territory
Flora of Queensland
Flora of New South Wales
Plants described in 1853
Taxa named by Ferdinand von Mueller